Donizete is a given name and surname. Notable people with the name include:

 Donizete Oliveira (born 1968), Brazilian football midfielder
 Leandro Donizete (born 1982), Brazilian football midfielder
 Marinho Donizete (born 1980), Brazilian football defender
 Osmar Donizete Cândido (born 1968), Brazilian football forward
 Rubens Donizete (born 1979), Brazilian bicyclist

See also
Donizetti (disambiguation)